Iryna Havrylivna Palchykova-Biletska (born March 22, 1959) is a former Soviet/Ukrainian handball player who competed in the 1980 Summer Olympics.

In 1980, she won the gold medal with the Soviet team. She played all five matches and scored four goals.

External links
Profile

1959 births
Living people
Soviet female handball players
Ukrainian female handball players
Handball players at the 1980 Summer Olympics
Olympic handball players of the Soviet Union
Olympic gold medalists for the Soviet Union
Olympic medalists in handball
Medalists at the 1980 Summer Olympics